The years before 1890 featured the pre-1890 North Indian Ocean cyclone seasons. Each season was an event in the annual cycle of tropical cyclone formation. The North Indian tropical cyclone season has no bounds, but they tend to form between April and December, peaks in May and November. These dates conventionally delimit the period of each year when most tropical cyclones form in the northern Indian Ocean. Below are the most significant cyclones in the time period. Because much of the North Indian coastline is near sea level and prone to flooding, these cyclones can easily kill many with storm surge and flooding. These cyclones are among the deadliest on earth in terms of numbers killed.

Before 18th century
1000 - A Cyclone with Hurricane force Winds struck North Cinque Island of Andaman Islands. 
1480 - A cyclone deepened the channels of Adam's Bridge, making it no longer possible to walk from India to Sri Lanka.
1484 - A Cyclone struck Chittagong Coast of Bangladesh with Hurricane force winds, killing 200000 people.
1582 – A tropical cyclone impacted the Sundarbans and West Bengal which killed 200,000 people. According to Banglapedia, a five-hour hurricane and thunderstorm destroyed houses and boats in the coast near Bakerganj (presently in Barisal and Patuakhali). Only Hindu temples with a strong foundation were spared.
1584 – A tropical cyclone impacted Bangladesh and killed 200,000 people.
15 May 1618- A tropical cyclone impacted Bombay and was described as "Disastrous" 
1688 – A tropical cyclone impacted the Sundarbans and West Bengal.
September 1698- A Tropical cyclone struck Bombay 
1699 – A tropical cyclone impacted Kolkata and killed 60,000 people.

18th century
30 November 1702- A Tropical cyclone struck Bombay and destroyed all the small boats of the island, and the mango, jack and palm trees were blown down. The wind destroyed almost the whole produce of the island and wrecked the greater part of the shipping, The Cyclone was preceded with a plaque outbreak 
November 13–14, 1721 – A tropical cyclone impacted Madras.
October 7–12, 1737 – A tropical cyclone impacted the Sundarbans and West Bengal and killed 3,000–300,000 people.
November 9, 1740- A tropical cyclone impacted Bombay 
September 11, 1742-  A tropical cyclone struck Bombay ,the storm would force all the ships in the harbour from their anchors. Royal ships called Somerset and Salisbury, were damaged from the Tempest. The storm bought great devastation and was described as "The Records state that the gale was so excessive, ’as has not been exceeded in the memory of any one now on the spot" 
March 7, 1762- A Tropical cyclone struck Bombay 
December 1789 – A tropical cyclone impacted Coringa, India and killed 20,000.
November 1799- A tropical cyclone passed over Bombay

Early 19th century
1807 – A tropical cyclone impacted West Bengal and killed 90,000 people.
1822 - A cyclone struck Bangladesh and killed 40,000 people.
1831 – An intense tropical cyclone impacted Odisha.
1833 – A tropical cyclone impacted West Bengal and killed around 50,000 people, with a record low of 891 milibar in North Indian Ocean, lowest over Indian Ocean.
June 15, 1837- A cyclone struck Mumbai that destroyed 400 houses
1847 – A tropical cyclone impacted Bengal where it caused 75,000 deaths and 6000 cattle.
1854- A Tropical cyclone struck Bombay causing Considerable damage

1839 India cyclone

A tropical cyclone impacted Andhra Pradesh, India on November 25, 1839 and killed around 300,000 people.

Late 19th century

1864 Calcutta cyclone

On October 5, a powerful cyclone hit near Calcutta, India, killing around 300,100 people.  The anemometer in the city was blown away during the cyclone.  Over 100 brick homes and tens of thousands of tiled and straw huts were leveled.  Most ships in the harbor (172 out of 195) were either damaged or destroyed. The  cyclone of 1864 destroyed the ports at Khejuri and Hijli.

November 1867 Great Calcutta cyclone
The anemometer in the city was blown away during the cyclone.  A lack of storm surge minimized the overall damage from this system.

October 1874 Bengal cyclone
This severe cyclone killed 80,000 people and caused significant damage.

October 1876 Backerganj cyclone

On October 31, a cyclone hit the Meghna River Delta area of India. The storm surge killed 100,000, and the disease after the storm killed another 100,000.

1877 season

1878 season

1879 season

1880 season

June 1885 Aden cyclone
The ship Peshawar reported a westerly hurricane at the east end of the Gulf of Aden towards midnight on the night of June 2. At noon on June 3, the Tantallon reported a pressure of  near 12.5N 45.5E. On June 3, the German corvette Augusta, the French dispatch boat Renard, and the British ship SS Speke Hall were lost in the storm in the Gulf of Aden. The system continued westward and shrank in scale as it moved into the entrance of the Red Sea, crossing the coast of Djibouti. It became the first north indian ocean tropical cyclone in recorded history to transit the gulf of Aden with fully hurricane intensity and held the record of westernmost landfalling North Indian Ocean tropical cyclone ever.

1885 Odisha cyclone
An intense cyclone struck Odisha.
It killed one person.

1888 Gujarat Cyclone
On November a violent cyclonic storm with hurricane-force winds struck Gujarat causing a ship sunk, killing 1300 people.

See also

List of tropical cyclones in Pakistan
North Indian Ocean tropical cyclone
Tropical cyclones in India
List of tropical cyclones
Tropical cyclone
Saffir–Simpson scale
Pacific typhoon season
Atlantic hurricane season
Pacific hurricane season
List of Australian region cyclones before 1900
Pre-1900 South Pacific cyclone seasons
List of South-West Indian Ocean cyclones before 1900

References

General references

External links
JTWC Archive
Cyclone related disasters

1800
1800
Indian Ocean North,1800
India,1800